Boolean operations on polygons are a set of Boolean operations (AND, OR, NOT, XOR, ...) operating on one or more sets of polygons in computer graphics. These sets of operations are widely used in computer graphics, CAD, and in EDA (in integrated circuit physical design and verification software).

Algorithms 

 Greiner–Hormann clipping algorithm
 Vatti clipping algorithm
 Sutherland–Hodgman algorithm (special case algorithm)
 Weiler–Atherton clipping algorithm (special case algorithm)

Uses in software 

Early algorithms for Boolean operations on polygons were based on the use of bitmaps. Using bitmaps in modeling polygon shapes has many drawbacks. One of the drawbacks is that the memory usage can be very large, since the resolution of polygons is proportional to the number of bits used to represent polygons. The higher the resolution is desired, the more the number of bits is required.

Modern implementations for Boolean operations on polygons tend to use plane sweep algorithms (or Sweep line algorithms). A list of papers using plane sweep algorithms for Boolean operations on polygons can be found in References below.

Boolean operations on convex polygons and monotone polygons of the same direction may be performed in linear time.

See also
 Boolean algebra
 Computational geometry
 Constructive solid geometry, a method of defining three-dimensional shapes using a similar set of operations
 Geometry processing
 General Polygon Clipper, a C library which computes the results of clipping operations

Notes

Bibliography 

 Mark de Berg, Marc van Kreveld, Mark Overmars, and Otfried Schwarzkopf, Computational Geometry - Algorithms and Applications, Second Edition, 2000
 Jon Louis Bentley and Thomas A. Ottmann, Algorithms for Reporting and Counting Geometric Intersections, IEEE Transactions on Computers, Vol. C-28, No. 9, September 1979, pp. 643–647
 Jon Louis Bentley and Derick Wood, An Optimal Worst Case Algorithm for Reporting Intersections of Rectangles, IEEE Transactions on Computers, Vol. C-29. No. 7, July 1980, pp. 571–577
 Ulrich Lauther, An O(N log N) Algorithm for Boolean Mask Operations, 18th Design Automation Conference, 1981, pp. 555–562
 James A. Wilmore, Efficient Boolean Operations on IC Masks, 18th Design Automation Conference, 1981, pp. 571–579
 
 Thomas Ottmann, Peter Widmayer, and Derick Wood, "A Fast Algorithm for the Boolean Masking Problem," Computer Vision, Graphics, and Image Processing, 30, 1985, pp. 249–268

External links
 UIUC Computational Geometry Pages
 Constructive planar geometry, by Dave Eberly.

Software
 Michael Leonov has compiled a comparison of polygon clippers.
 Angus Johnson has also compared three clipping libraries.
 SINED GmbH has compared performance and memory utilization of three polygon clippers.
 A comparison of 5 clipping libraries at rogue-modron.blogspot.com
 A commercial library for 3D Boolean operations: sgCore C++/C# library.
 The comp.graphics.algorithms FAQ, solutions to mathematical problems with 2D and 3D Polygons.
 Matthias Kramm's gfxpoly, a free C library for 2D polygons (BSD license).
 Klaas Holwerda's Boolean, a C++ library for 2D polygons.
 David Kennison's Polypack, a FORTRAN library based on the Vatti algorithm.
 Klamer Schutte's Clippoly, a polygon clipper written in C++.
 Michael Leonov's poly_Boolean, a C++ library, which extends the Schutte algorithm.
 Angus Johnson's Clipper, an open-source freeware library (written in Delphi, C++ and C#) that's based on the Vatti algorithm.
 GeoLib, a commercial library available in C++ and C#.
 Alan Murta's GPC, General Polygon Clipper library.
 PolygonLib, C++ and COM libraries for 2D polygons (optimized for large polygon sets, built-in spatial indices).  

Geometric algorithms
Geometry processing